Anastasia Gorbunova (born 17 May 1994) is a Russian triathlete. She competed in the women's event at the 2020 Summer Olympics held in Tokyo, Japan. She also competed in the mixed relay event.

References

External links
 

1994 births
Living people
Russian female triathletes
Olympic triathletes of Russia
Triathletes at the 2020 Summer Olympics
People from Novocheboksarsk
Sportspeople from Chuvashia
20th-century Russian women
21st-century Russian women